KSDY may refer to:

 KSDY-LD, a low-power television station (channel 31, virtual 50) licensed to serve San Diego, California, United States
 Sidney–Richland Municipal Airport (ICAO code KSDY)